Bojong Kokosan Museum is a museum that was built as the appreciation for the Indonesian fighters against the British army and Netherlands Indies Civil Administration (NICA) during Netherlands colonialisation. The battle occurred in December 1945 to 1946. Bojong Kokosan Museum is located in Jalan Siliwangi number 75 in Sukabumi Regency, West Java, Indonesia.

sukabumi Regency
Museums in West Java
Military and war museums in Indonesia
History museums in Indonesia